Detective Knight: Independence (also known as Devil's Knight) is a 2023 American action film directed by Edward Drake, who wrote the screenplay and co-wrote the story with Corey Large. Serving as the third and final installment of the Detective Knight trilogy, and as a sequel to Detective Knight: Redemption (2022), it stars Bruce Willis, Jack Kilmer, Lochlyn Munro, Jimmy Jean-Louis, Willow Shields, Dina Meyer, and Timothy V. Murphy.

Detective Knight: Independence was released by Lionsgate in select theaters and VOD on January 20, 2023, followed by its release on DVD and Blu-ray on February 28, 2023.

Premise
After the events of Redemption, Detective James Knight tries to stop a rogue vigilante and an out-of-control EMT vehicle from putting the city in danger on Independence Day. The detective's race against time also involves saving his own home from a suspected explosion.

Cast

Production
In October 2021, Bruce Willis signed on to star in an action film under the working title Devil's Knight, from writer-director Edward John Drake, for a back-to-back production with Christmas Knight in Vancouver, Canada, from November 17 to December 14, 2021. Filming had wrapped by January 9, 2022, while Trevor Gretzky was confirmed to have reprised his role for both films. By September 2022, Devil's Knight was retitled to Detective Knight: Independence, and set a January 20, 2023 release date. By October 2022, Lochlyn Munro, Jimmy Jean-Louis, Corey Large, and Cesar Miramontes were set to reprise their roles from the first two films, while Willow Shields, Jack Kilmer, Alvaro Calderon, Dina Meyer, and Timothy V. Murphy were added to the cast. Detective Knight: Independence is one of the last films to star Willis, who retired from acting because he was diagnosed with frontotemporal dementia.

Release
Detective Knight: Independence was released by Lionsgate in limited theaters and VOD on January 20, 2023, followed by its release on DVD and Blu-ray on February 28, 2023. The film was previously expected to be delayed to July 2023, to tie into the Independence Day holiday.

Box office
As of February 1, 2023, Detective Knight: Independence grossed $36,171 in the United Arab Emirates.

Critical reception

Anton Bitel of Projected Figures gave the film a positive review, summarizing that "Edward Drake's police trilogy closer is Bruce Willis' swan song, and a rueful reassessment of his career". Evan Dossey of Midwest Film Journal also gave the film a positive review, saying the film is "the most straightforward of the trilogy, and also the best. Willis gets a little more to do here than in previous Knight thrillers". Michael Szymanski of Mike Szy The Writer gave the film a 9/10 rating, writing, "this crime thriller trilogy of the Detective Knight series is a fitting finale to Bruce Willis's action movie career".

In a negative review, Lapacazo Sandoval of New York Amsterdam News wrote "Would I ever pay money to watch this in a theater, the answer is no. Would I purchase or download this movie on a streaming service, again, the answer is no."

References

External links
 
 

2020s American films
2020s English-language films
2023 action adventure films
2023 action thriller films
2023 films
2023 independent films
American action thriller films
American films about revenge
American independent films
Films about the Los Angeles Police Department
Films about the New York City Police Department
Films directed by Edward John Drake
Films shot in Vancouver
Independence Day (United States) films
Lionsgate films